Many international organizations also have supranational aspects, meaning that decisions can be made by the organization as a whole that are binding on member states that disagree.

Definition 

Political Unification Revisited: On Building Supranational Communities by Amitai Etzioni offers the definition of supranationality that is used in this entry. Etzioni writes that supranationality can be thought of as "a composite of several elements."  These elements can be present alone or all together.  The three elements of supranationality are defined as follows:

Making of significant decisions by a body that is not made of national representatives and that does not receive instructions from national governments.  (Though such a body is frequently elected by national authorities or their constituents. Frequently such a body is made up of officials acting in an individual capacity.)
The subjects or participants (national governments or individuals) are legally obligated to comply with the decisions of the body.
Individuals or other private parties may interact directly with the body and/or have legal obligations as stated above.

Examples

References 

International law
Supranational unions
Global politics